High Level Airport  is located  north northwest of High Level, Alberta, Canada. National Car Rental and Enterprise Rent-A-Car have an office onsite.

Airlines and destinations

See also
High Level/Footner Lake Water Aerodrome

References

External links

 on COPA's Places to Fly airport directory

Certified airports in Alberta
Mackenzie County